Maidan casualties, known in Ukraine as the Heavenly Hundred (Nebesna sotnya; or "Heavenly Company"), are people who were killed during the 2014 Ukrainian Revolution of Dignity, part of the wider Euromaidan movement, and the early phase of the Russo-Ukrainian War. The list includes 130 identified individuals from both sides of the conflict who died during the events, including 18 police officers who were killed by protesters. The majority of those killed were civilians who supported the revolution.

On 21 February, Verkhovna Rada recognized the perished protesters as victims. On 21 November 2014 a decree by Petro Poroshenko posthumously awarded the Hero of Ukraine title to the Ukrainian protesters of Euromaidan who were killed. Three non-Ukrainian citizens killed in the events were each posthumously awarded the title Knight of the Order of the Heaven's Hundred Heroes. Since 2015 "the Day of the Heavenly Hundred Heroes" is celebrated on 20 February to commemorate the deaths.

History

The first deaths occurred on Unity Day, 22 January, during riots on Hrushevskoho Street in Kyiv, where three activists were shot dead. On the same day, the dead body of activist Yuriy Verbytsky was found on the city outskirts; he had been kidnapped a day before with Ihor Lutsenko, who was released. These were the first victims to die in demonstrations in Ukraine since it gained national independence in 1991. The deaths caused widespread protests. On 23 January, then Prime Minister Mykola Azarov in a BBC interview said that police had not been issued firearms, and said no police officers were located on the rooftops around the protest area. He stated that the shooting of protesters was a provocation by extremist forces aimed at escalating violence. Party of Regions MP Arsen Klinchayev stated during a memorial service in Luhansk for those killed on 22 January by police, "These people were against the government. Nobody has the right to use physical force against police officers. And then they have their sticks, then stones, then something else. The police have the right to defend their lives. So I think it's right that these four people were killed. Moreover, I believe that you need to be stricter."

Five more deaths in connection with Euromaidan occurred between 25 January and 13 February.

The second active phase started February 18. After a brief truce on 19 February, the clashes renewed 20 February. According to the newspaper Ukrainska Pravda, special forces (Berkut) and Interior Troops snipers shot at people on Maidan and/or snipers located in nearby buildings, with the special forces firing AK-47 assault rifles. 20 February was the bloodiest day of the clashes, with at least 21 protesters killed. The final death toll from these clashes in late February was 103 protesters and 13 police. According to Deputy Prosecutor General of Ukraine Oleh Zalisko in February, 67 people were killed in Kyiv's city centre, 184 sustained gunshot wounds and over 750 suffered bodily injury. On 20 February, the (then) opposition parties (Batkivshchyna, UDAR and Svoboda) stated "To hold talks with the regime, the policies of which led to the deaths of many people, is an extremely unpleasant thing but we must do everything possible and even the impossible to prevent further bloodshed".

At least 17 people died from previously received wounds and injuries thereafter.

On 21 February, Maidan participants wished farewell to the perished protesters who they named the Heavenly Hundred. During the event, a mourning Lemko song "A duck floats on the Tysa..." was heard.

On 24 February, the Verkhovna Rada (Ukraine's parliament) decided to propose that the next Ukrainian president award the title Hero of Ukraine to protesters killed in the clashes.

Identity of snipers

Those responsible for the murders have never  been found. President Volodymyr Zelenskyy stated in 2020 that "evidence and documents have been lost, while the scene of the crime has been tampered with and “cleaned up.” He could not say when those who gave the orders would be found, but gave assurances that the matter is being “dealt with faster than several years ago.”

Legal hearings and investigation
Investigation about Euromaidan was ongoing since December 2013 following the initial dispersal of student gathering on the night of 30 November. On 13 December 2013 the President Viktor Yanukovych and government officials announced that three high-ranking officials will be brought to justice. The General Prosecutor's Office of Ukraine questioned a chairman of the Kyiv City State Administration Oleksandr Popov on 13 December and a Security Council secretary Andriy Klyuev on 16 December. The announcement about ongoing investigation became public at the so-called "round table" negotiations initiated by former Ukrainian President Leonid Kravchuk. On 14 December, both Sivkovych and Popov were officially temporarily relieved of their duties until conclusion of the investigation.

On 17 December the Prosecutor General questioned an activist Ruslana Lyzhychko who informed that beside Popov under pre-trial investigation are Sivkovych, Koriak and Fedchuk. On request of parliamentary opposition, Prosecutor General Viktor Pshonka read in Verkhovna Rada (Ukrainian parliament) a report on investigation about dispersal of protesters on 30 November. During the report the Prosecutor General acknowledged that members of public order militsiya "Berkut" "exceeded the use of force" after being provoked by protesters. Pshonka also noted that investigation has not yet determined who exactly ordered use of force. Following the PG's report, the parliamentary opposition registered a statement on creation of provisional investigation committee in regards to actions of law enforcement agencies towards peaceful protests in Kyiv.

Earlier, a separate investigation was started by the Security Service of Ukraine on 8 December 2013 about actions aimed at seizing state power in Ukraine. In the context of the 1 December 2013 Euromaidan riots, the Prosecutor General informed that in calls for the overthrow of the government are involved member of radical groups. During the events at Bankova, the Ukrainian militsiya managed to detained 9 people and after few days the Ministry of Internal Affairs announced that it considers Ukrainian organization Bratstvo (see Dmytro Korchynsky) to be involved in instigation of disorders, while no one out of the detained were members of that organization.

Ukrainian mass media reported the results of forensic examinations, according to which, the government police Berkut was implicated in the murders of maidan protesters since, according to these forensic examinations, matches were found between the bullets extracted from the bodies of maidan protesters and the weapons of the government police Berkut. The experts explained why no match between the bullets and the weapons, which had been assigned to the Berkut special force, had been found as a result of the examination of the bullets held in January 2015, whereas the examination carried out in December of the same year had showed such a match.

Identified deaths

Unnamed dead activists
Unidentified activists were reported killed.
During the Hrushevskoho Street riots, a 22‑year-old man died falling from the colonnade near the Lobanovsky Dynamo Stadium during a beating by police; the cause of death was multiple injuries, particularly spinal fracture.
Two unnamed shooting victims were announced on the evening of 22 February. Their bodies disappeared from the street after the action of Berkut in the early morning 22 January. Roman Senyk was later identified as shot and killed on this date.
On 26 January, the body of a man was found in Obolon district, with his hands bound.
On 29 January, two male activists were shot on Hrushevskoho Street and brought to a Kyiv hospital. One died from gunshot wounds the following day. A UDAR MP accused police of shooting the two as a provocation.
On 15 February, the body of a missing activist was found outside of Kyiv.
On 18–19 February, 16 protesters were killed in clashes, of whom 7 have been named.
On 19 February at 9pm a young man was killed in Khmelnytsky outside the SBU building. 5Kanal reported both a 23‑year-old and a 16‑year-old were shot and killed.
On 20 February, at least 34 protesters were shot dead as of 1pm, with reporters verifying the bodies (15 at Kozatsky Hotel, 12 at Ukraine Hotel, 7 at the central post office). Kyiv Post journalists reported an additional eight bodies on Khreshchatyk Street early afternoon, separate from the previous count. Olha Bohomolets, one of the attending physicians to 12 fatal gunshot victims at Ukraine Hotel, said that the victims were shot with precision rifles and powerful ammunition that broke their bones.

Other deaths
On 18 February militants from the Social-National Assembly and the Patriots of Ukraine seized and burned down the central office of the ruling Party of Regions. A 57-year-old IT engineer Vladimir Konstantinovich Zakharov died in the fire. According to Party of Regions' statement, Zakharov proposed to the attackers to provide an exit route for the women office workers and was mortally struck in the head with a bat. According to the Ukrainian news site Censor.net, Zakharov died of carbon monoxide poisoning while taking money from the office safe. On 10 April 2020 Ukraine's State Bureau of Investigations handed a murder suspicion notice to a former People's Deputy of Ukraine Tetiana Chornovol. Chornovol is accused of "controlling actions of a group of people and directly participating in the arson" of the Party of Regions office building.

Police officers' deaths
As of 2 March, The Ministry of Internal Affairs reported 18 officer fatalities related to the conflict. Two deaths that occurred during the crisis were considered by The Interior Ministry's as having no relation to Euromaidan or civil unrest. In addition, according to the Minister of Internal Affairs, another police officer, 30-year-old captain of the Internal Troops of Ukraine Dmytro Donets, died from a heart attack. On 18 February, six officers were killed in action against protest camps in Kyiv.

Legacy

Ukrainian sources refer to the activists who died during Euromaidan as "The Heavenly Hundred". In April 2014, the Kyiv City State Administration and Culture Ministry of Ukraine stated that they expected to open a memorial complex "to the heroes of Heavenly Hundred" in February 2015, on the occasion of the anniversary of the death activists. On 1 July 2014, the Verkhovna Rada (the parliament of Ukraine) established the Medal "Order of the Heavenly Hundred Heroes". On 25 August 2014, President Petro Poroshenko claimed he had called the 2014 Ukrainian parliamentary election in order to purify parliament of MPs who had supported "the [January] Dictatorship laws that took the lives of the Heavenly hundred".

Kyiv City Council renamed a part of Instytutska Street into Heavenly Hundred Heroes Avenue on 20 November 2014.

President Poroshenko decreed on 11 February 2015 that 20 February will annually be commemorated as "Day of the Heavenly Hundred Heroes". His decree established [an action plan to accomplish] a museum in Kyiv dedicated to Euromaidan. On 20 February, it is compulsory for Ukrainian TV channels to display a flaming candle or a similar stylized image, and, at 12:00, a minute of silence must be observed.

Monuments

 On 23 February in Poltava, a former monument of Lenin, which was taken down a couple of days prior on 21 February, had its pedestal converted into a "monument of the Maidan Heroes".
 On 13 April 2014 in Buda, Chyhyryn Raion (vicinity of historical Cold Ravine), a monument to "the Heavenly Hundred" was installed.
 On 6 May 2014 in Dubno, a commemorative landmark to "the Heavenly Hundred" was consecrated. 
 On 21 September 2015 outside of Chicago in Bloomingdale, Illinois, a monument commemorating the people perished during the Euromaidan was erected.

See also
 Casualties of the Russo-Ukrainian War

References

External links

 Website dedicated to the killed protesters
 Website dedicated to the killed protesters, related news, investigations and litigations (in Ukrainian)
 "Site-Requiem dedicated to those who died in the turmolous days of the Eurorevolution" (in Ukrainian and Russian)

Euromaidan
Euromaidan
Ukraine-related lists